Sinocarum is a genus of flowering plants belonging to the family Apiaceae.

Its native range is Himalaya to Southern Central China and Myanmar.

Species:

Sinocarum acronemifolium 
Sinocarum bellum 
Sinocarum clarkeanum 
Sinocarum coloratum 
Sinocarum cruciatum 
Sinocarum digitatum 
Sinocarum dolichopodum 
Sinocarum filicinum 
Sinocarum latifoliolatum 
Sinocarum longii 
Sinocarum meeboldioides 
Sinocarum normanianum 
Sinocarum pityophilum 
Sinocarum pulchellum 
Sinocarum sikkimense 
Sinocarum staintonianum 
Sinocarum vaginatum 
Sinocarum wolffianum 
Sinocarum woodii

References

Apioideae
Apioideae genera